In psychiatry, thought withdrawal is the delusional belief that thoughts have been 'taken out' of the patient's mind, and the patient has no power over this. It often accompanies thought blocking. The patient may experience a break in the flow of their thoughts, believing that the missing thoughts have been withdrawn from their mind by some outside agency. This delusion is one of Schneider's first rank symptoms for schizophrenia. Because thought withdrawal is characterized as a delusion, according to the DSM-IV TR it represents a positive symptom of schizophrenia.

See also
 Thought insertion
 Thought broadcasting

References

Delusional disorders